"Love You More" is a song by American singer Ginuwine. It was co-written by Casino Joe, Brandon Howard, and James Smith for his fourth studio album The Senior (2003), while production on the track overseen by the former. Released by Epic Records as the album's fourth and final in March 2004, it peaked at number 28 on the US Hot R&B/Hip-Hop Songs chart.

Track listing

Charts

References

Ginuwine songs
2003 singles
Songs written by Ginuwine